The list includes and details significant events that occurred in the global history of national-level implementations of, or changes made to, laws surrounding the use, sale, or production of the psychoactive drug cannabis.

1300s
 1378: Soudoun Sheikouni, the Emir of the Joneima in Arabia, outlawed the use of cannabis across his jurisdiction. Sheikouni's prohibition is one of the earliest, if not the earliest, attested cannabis ban in the world.

1700s
 1787: Madagascar's King Andrianampoinimerina took the throne, and soon after banned cannabis throughout the Merina Kingdom, implementing capital punishment as the penalty for its use.

1800s
 1800: Shortly following Napoleon's invasion of Egypt and concerned by his troops' smoking of hashish and drinking of cannabis-based beverages, he banned the drug and the establishments that provided it.
 1830: The Municipal Council of Rio de Janeiro, Brazil, prohibited bringing cannabis into the city, and punished its use by any slave.
 1840: The British colony of Mauritius banned cannabis.
 1861: British Guiana passed a law entitled An Ordinance to Regulate the Sale of Opium and Bhang.
 1867: The British colonial government of Sri Lanka introduced the Opium and Bhang Ordinance, restricting the sale of cannabis to licensed dealers only.
 1870: The British Natal Colony (now in South Africa) passed the Coolie Law Consolidation prohibiting: "the smoking, use, or possession by and the sale, barter, or gift to, any Coolies [Indian indentured workers] whatsoever, of any portion of the hemp plant (Cannabis sativa)..."
 1870: Singapore banned cannabis.
 1877: The Ottoman government in Constantinople mandated that all hashish in Egypt be destroyed, and in 1879 importation of cannabis was banned by the Khedivate of Egypt.
 1890: Morocco's Sultan Hassan I instituted strict regulations on cultivation and trade, but also conferred clear cannabis production privileges on several Rif tribes.
 1890: Greece banned the cultivation, importation, and use of cannabis.
 1894: In British India the Indian Hemp Drugs Commission released its findings, concluding that "The moderate use practically produces no ill effects. In all but the most exceptional cases, the injury from habitual moderate use is not appreciable."

1900s
 1913: Jamaica banned cannabis with the Ganja Law, supported by the white ruling class and the Council of Evangelical Churches in Jamaica.
 1914: British East Africa Protectorate banned cannabis.
 1920: Sierra Leone banned cannabis.
 1920: Mexico banned the cultivation, sale, and recreational use of cannabis.
 1922: South Africa banned cannabis nationally, under the Customs and Excises Duty Act.
 1923: Canada banned cannabis.
 1923: Panama banned the cultivation and use of cannabis.
 1924: Sudan banned the cultivation and use of cannabis.
 1925: The League of Nations signs the 1925 Opium Convention, for the first time adding pure cannabis extract among drugs under international control.
 1925: Trinidad and Tobago banned cannabis.
 1926: Lebanon prohibited hashish.
 1926: Australia banned cannabis.
 1927: Indonesia banned cannabis.
 1928: The United Kingdom first prohibited cannabis as a drug, in accordance with the 1925 Opium Convention, adding cannabis as an addendum to the Dangerous Drugs Act 1920. 
 1928: Romania established laws for countering narcotics, including hashish and its preparations.
 1934: The Irish Free State prohibited cannabis and cannabis resin with the Dangerous Drugs Act 1934.
 1935: The Office international d'hygiène publique recommends adding preparations of cannabis (and not only pure extracts) under control of the 1925 Convention.
 1935: Thailand criminalized cannabis.
 1937: The United States passed the Marijuana Tax Act, effectively prohibiting most use of cannabis on a federal level due to the heavy burdens of the tax.
 1939: Burma legalized and licensed the production and sale of cannabis.
 1948: Japan adopted the Cannabis Control Law, establishing a licensing system for dealers, and punishments for unlicensed use or sale.
 1951: Poland classified cannabis as a narcotic.
 1953: Tunisia, under French rule,  banned cannabis.
 1953: The Netherlands criminalized cannabis.
 1956: Morocco becomes independent, and banned cannabis by royal decree.
 1961: The United Nations Single Convention on Narcotic Drugs decreed: "The use of cannabis for other than medical and scientific purposes must be discontinued as soon as possible but in any case within twenty-five years..."
 1965: New Zealand banned cannabis under the Narcotics Act.
 1966: Finland prohibited cannabis.
 1968: The government of the Republic of Vietnam "publicly condemned" the use or trafficking of cannabis, and instructed local chiefs to prevent its cultivation.
 1969: Iceland & Denmark banned cannabis.
 1970: The United States passed the Controlled Substances Act, prohibiting cannabis federally along with several other drugs and replacing the 1937 act.
 1972: The Netherlands divided drugs into more- and less-dangerous categories, with cannabis being in the lesser category. Accordingly, possession of 30 grams or less was made a misdemeanor.
 1973: Nepal canceled the licenses of all cannabis shops, dealers, and farmers, under pressure from the United States and the international community.
 1973: Afghanistan's King Zahir Shah outlawed cannabis production, followed by genuine commitment to eradication, backed by $47 million in funding from the United States government.
 1975: Comoros' Ali Soilih seized power, and among other radical reforms to gain the support of youth, legalized cannabis in Comoros.
 1976: South Korea passed the Cannabis Control Act.
 1988: Paraguay decriminalized personal possession of 10 grams of cannabis or less.
 1989: Bangladesh banned the sale of cannabis.
 1992: Lebanon banned and eradicates cannabis, under US pressure.
1996: California becomes the first jurisdiction in the United States to legalize cannabis for medicinal use (Proposition 215).
 1997: Poland criminalized possession of cannabis.

2000s
 2001: Luxembourg decriminalized cannabis.
2001: Canada legalized medical cannabis.
 2001: Portugal decriminalized all drugs, including cannabis.
 2003: Belgium decriminalized cannabis.
 2004: Russia decriminalized cannabis.
 2005: Estonia decriminalized all drugs, including cannabis.
 2005: Chile decriminalized cannabis.
 2006: Brazil decriminalized possession and cultivation of personal amounts of cannabis.
 2008: Austria legalized medical cannabis.
 2009: Ukraine decriminalized cannabis cultivation up to 10 cannabis plants for personal use.
 2009: Mexico decriminalized possession of up to 5 grams of cannabis.
 2009: Argentina decriminalized cannabis.
 2010: Czech Republic decriminalized cannabis.
 2011: Denmark approves several cannabis-derived drugs for medical use.
 2012: Switzerland decriminalized possession of 10 grams or less to a fine.
 2012: Colombia decriminalized possession of 20 grams or less.
 2012: Washington State and Colorado voters vote to legalize recreational cannabis; beginning of green rush
 2013: Croatia decriminalized possession of cannabis.
 2013: Uruguay legalized cannabis, becoming the first country in the modern era to explicitly do so.
2013: Italy legalized medical cannabis.
 2013: Romania became the tenth EU country to legalize medical cannabis.
 2013: Czech Republic legalized cannabis for medical use.
2013: France legalized the sale of medications containing cannabis derivatives.
 2015: Malta decriminalized cannabis.
 2015: Colombia legalized medical cannabis.
 2015: Croatia legalized cannabis-based drugs for specified medical purposes.
 2015: Jamaica decriminalized possession of up to 2 ounces of cannabis and legalized the cultivation for personal use of up to 5 plants.
 2015: Spain decriminalized cannabis cultivation up to 10 cannabis plants for personal use.
 2016: Austria decriminalized possession of small amounts of cannabis.
 2016: North Macedonia legalized medical cannabis.
 2016: Australia legalized medicinal cannabis at the federal level.
 2016: Poland legalized medical cannabis.
 2016: Norway made allowances for medical cannabis.
 2016: Georgia's Supreme Court ruled that imprisonment for possession of small amounts of cannabis is unconstitutional.
 2017: Germany legalized medical cannabis.
 2017: Cyprus legalized the medical use of cannabis oil for advanced stage cancer patients.
 2017: Belize decriminalized possession or use of 10 grams or less on private premises.
 2017: Greece legalized medical cannabis.
 2017: Peru legalized cannabis oil for medical use.
 2017: Luxembourg legalized medical cannabis.
 2017: Lesotho granted modern Africa's first medical cannabis license.
 2017: Georgia decriminalized cannabis.
 2017: Lithuania criminalized cannabis.
 2017: Spain legalized cannabis.
 2018: Denmark legalized cannabis-based medicines.
 2018: Malta legalized medicinal cannabis with a prescription.
2018: Portugal legalized medical cannabis.
 2018: South Korea passed amendments to the Narcotics Control Act, becoming the first to legalize medical cannabis in East Asia.
 2018: Zimbabwe legalized cannabis for medical and scientific purposes.
2018: Canada legalized cannabis.
2018: Thailand legalized medical cannabis.
2018: South Africa decriminalized cannabis.
2018: The United Kingdom legalized medical cannabis.
2019: Ireland legalized medical cannabis as part of a five-year pilot program.
2019: Israel decriminalized cannabis.
2019: Trinidad and Tobago decriminalized cannabis allowing up to 30 grams per individual and cultivation of four plants per household.
2020: Australian Capital Territory legalized cannabis possession and growth for personal use.
2020: Malawi legalized medical cannabis.
2020: Lebanon legalized medical cannabis.
2020: United Nations partially deschedules cannabis by removing it from its most restrictive list, Schedule IV.
2021: Mexico officially decriminalizes adult use of cannabis, after years of de facto decriminalization.
2021: Rwanda legalizes medical use of cannabis.
2021: Malta legalized cannabis.
2021–2022: Thailand decriminalized cannabis.

See also

Timeline of cannabis laws in the United States
Legality of cannabis

References

External links
Cannabis general timeline. Erowid.org

Cannabis

History of drug control
Cannabis-related lists